Finella is a genus of sea snails, marine gastropod mollusks in the family Scaliolidae.

This genus has been assigned in the course of time to different families by different authors: Rissoidae, Cerithiidae, Dialidae, Obtortionidae, Finellidae and Diastomatidae Morphological and anatomical studies by Winston Ponder in 1994 established that the genera Finella and Scaliola didn't belong in the above-mentioned families and he brought them in a new family Scaliolidae. This was supported in 1982 by Healy through the study of the ultrastructure on the spermatozoa.

Description
The species in this genus contain a small, elongated, conical shell without siphonal canal. The axial to spiral sculpture varies between weak and strong.

Distribution
The snails of this species are common to even abundant in shallow waters of the tropical Indo-West Pacific Ocean.

Species
Species within the genus Finella include:

 Finella adamsi (Dall, 1889)
 Finella barbarensis (Bartsch, 1911)
 Finella californica (Dall & Bartsch, 1901)
 Finella dubia (d’Orbigny, 1840)
 Finella geayi Lamy, 1910
 Finella hamlini (Bartsch, 1911)
 Finella io (Bartsch, 1911)
 Finella longinqua (Haas, 1949)
 Finella phanea (Bartsch, 1911)
 Finella portoricana (Dall & Simpson, 1901)
 Finella pupoides Adams A., 1860
 Finella tenuisculpta (Carpenter, 1864)

References

 Ponder W.F. 1994. The anatomy and relationships of Finella and Scaliola (Caenogastropoda: Cerithioidea: Scaliolidae). In: Morton B. (ed.) The malacofauna of Hong Kong and Southern China III, pp. 215–241, Hong Kong University Press
 Gofas, S.; Le Renard, J.; Bouchet, P. (2001). Mollusca, in: Costello, M.J. et al. (Ed.) (2001). European register of marine species: a check-list of the marine species in Europe and a bibliography of guides to their identification. Collection Patrimoines Naturels, 50: pp. 180–213
 Spencer, H.; Marshall. B. (2009). All Mollusca except Opisthobranchia. In: Gordon, D. (Ed.) (2009). New Zealand Inventory of Biodiversity. Volume One: Kingdom Animalia. 584 pp

External links
 Hasegawa K. (1998). "A review of recent Japanese species previously assigned to Eufenella and Clathrofenella (Mollusca: Gastropoda: Cerithioidea)". Memoirs of the National Science Museum (Tokyo) 31: 165-186. PDF.

Scaliolidae